Niclas ("Nic") Jönsson (born August 4, 1967, Bankeryd) is a Swedish racing driver, currently driving in the FIA World Endurance Championship.  He drove in the Indy Racing League in the 1999 and 2000 seasons with 4 career starts.  His best career IRL finish was in 12th position in the 2000 Delphi Indy 200 held at Walt Disney World Speedway.  He made one NASCAR Busch Series (now Xfinity Series) start at Montreal in August 2007, he started 8th, led five laps, and finished 12th in the #28 car for Jay Robinson Racing.

In 2009 he was hired by USF1 team owner Ken Anderson as a test driver for the fledgling American Formula 1 team.

Racing record

Complete American Open-Wheel racing results
(key)

Indy Racing League
(key) (Races in bold indicate pole position)

24 Hours of Le Mans results

NASCAR
(key) (Bold – Pole position awarded by qualifying time. Italics – Pole position earned by points standings or practice time. * – Most laps led.)

Busch Series

Complete European Le Mans Series results
(key) (Races in bold indicate pole position; races in italics indicate fastest lap)

Complete FIA World Endurance Championship results
(key) (Races in bold indicate pole position; races in italics indicate fastest lap)

Complete WeatherTech SportsCar Championship results
(key) (Races in bold indicate pole position; results in italics indicate fastest lap)

† Jönsson did not complete sufficient laps in order to score full points.

† Points only counted towards the Michelin Endurance Cup, and not the overall LMP3 Championship.

References
Svenske Niclas Jönsson letar efter amerikanen som kan vinna Formel 1
Rydell femma i Le Mans
Tuff kamp väntar på Le Mans
Hemmaseger på Le Mans
Ekström satsar på amerikansk legend

External links

1967 births
Living people
Swedish racing drivers
IndyCar Series drivers
Indy Lights drivers
Rolex Sports Car Series drivers
American Le Mans Series drivers
24 Hours of Le Mans drivers
24 Hours of Daytona drivers
European Le Mans Series drivers
FIA World Endurance Championship drivers
Barber Pro Series drivers
WeatherTech SportsCar Championship drivers
24H Series drivers
Eurasia Motorsport drivers
Paul Stewart Racing drivers
Extreme Speed Motorsports drivers
AF Corse drivers
Nürburgring 24 Hours drivers
Le Mans Cup drivers